Elizabeth Southerden Thompson (3 November 1846 – 2 October 1933), later known as Lady Butler, was a British painter who specialised in painting scenes from British military campaigns and battles, including the Crimean War and the Napoleonic Wars. Her notable works include The Roll Call (purchased by Queen Victoria), The Defence of Rorke's Drift, and Scotland Forever! (showing the Scots Greys at Waterloo).  She wrote about her military paintings in an autobiography published in 1922: "I never painted for the glory of war, but to portray its pathos and heroism." She was married to British Army officer Sir William Butler, becoming Lady Butler after he was knighted.

Early life and education
Born at the Villa Claremont in Lausanne, Switzerland, Butler was the daughter of Thomas James Thompson (1812–1881) and his second wife, Christiana Weller (1825–1910). Her sister was the noted essayist and poet Alice Meynell. Elizabeth began receiving art instruction in 1862, while growing up in Italy. In 1866, she entered the Female School of Art in South Kensington in London. She began exhibiting her artwork, usually watercolours, as a student. In 1867, one watercolour, Bavarian Artillery Going into Action, was shown at the Dudley Gallery, one of the galleries preferred by women artists. The same year, she exhibited an oil painting, Horses in Sunshine, at the Society of Female Artists.

She became a Roman Catholic along with the rest of her family after they moved to Florence in 1869. While in Florence, under the tutelage of the artist Giuseppe Bellucci (1827–1882), she attended the Accademia di Belle Arti. She signed her works as E.B., Elizth. Thompson, or Mimi Thompson (she was called "Mimi" from her childhood).

Artistic career 
Initially, Butler concentrated on religious subjects like The Magnificat (1872), but upon going to Paris in 1870, she was exposed to battle scenes from Jean Louis Ernest Meissonier and Édouard Detaille, and switched her focus to war paintings. With the painting Missing (1873), a Franco-Prussian War battle scene depicting the common soldiers' suffering and heroism, she earned her first submission to the Royal Academy. Butler's painting The Roll Call, which depicted a line of soldiers worn out with conflict, was shown in 1874 at the Royal Academy Summer Exhibition and became so popular that a policeman had to be stationed next to the painting in order to regulate the crowds that came to see it. Butler wrote that after the opening of the Summer Exhibition, she awoke to find herself famous.

Her fame increased as the paintings toured Europe, along with photographs of Elizabeth. She gained even more notice because people found out that she was both young and pretty, something normally not associated with painters of battle scenes. It also helped that during this time, there was a huge swell of Victorian pride and romanticism for the growing British Empire. While Lady Butler's topics reflected such romanticism, her paintings were generally realistic in detail, with aspects such as confusion, mud and exhaustion being accurately portrayed.  Her works tend to focus on British troops shown in action, or shortly after it, but avoiding scenes of hand-to-hand combat.  The troops are often shown as their opponents might have seen them, but relatively few of the opponents themselves are shown.

In 1879, Butler came within two votes of becoming the first woman to be elected as an Associate Member of the Royal Academy (apart from two founder Members, Mary Moser and Angelica Kauffman; ultimately, the first female Associate Member was Annie Swynnerton, elected in 1922, and the first full Member was Laura Knight in 1936).

After her marriage in 1877 to William Francis Butler, a distinguished officer of the British Army, from Tipperary, Ireland, Butler travelled to the far reaches of the Empire with her husband and raised their six children. Butler also did some black and white illustrations, including of poems by her sister, Alice Meynell, and of works by Thackeray. She exhibited her work at the Palace of Fine Arts and The Woman's Building at the 1893 World's Columbian Exposition in Chicago, Illinois. Her daughter, Elizabeth Butler, married Lt.-Col. Randolph Albert Fitzhardinge Kingscote (b. 6 Feb 1867, d. 8 Dec 1940) on 24 July 1903.

Later life and death 
On her husband's retirement from the army, she moved with him to Ireland, where they lived at Bansha Castle, County Tipperary. She showed pictures at the Royal Hibernian Academy from 1892. Among the paintings that she took with her to County Tipperary was a set of water-colours that she had painted while with her husband in Palestine. During the Irish Civil War they were transferred to her daughter in Gormanston Castle for safekeeping, but were almost all destroyed later by German bombs in London during the Second World War.

Lady Butler was widowed in 1910, but continued to live at Bansha until 1922, when she took up residence with the youngest of her six children, Eileen, Viscountess Gormanston, at Gormanston Castle, County Meath. She died there shortly before her 87th birthday and was interred at nearby Stamullen graveyard.

Butler was included in the 2018 exhibit Women in Paris 1850–1900.

Paintings

 The Magnificat (1872)
 Missing (1873)
 Calling the Roll After An Engagement, Crimea (or The Roll Call (1874) – H.M. The Queen; Buckingham Palace)
 Missed (1874)
 The 28th Regiment at Quatre Bras (1875 – National Gallery of Victoria, Melbourne)
 Balaclava (1876 – City of Manchester Art Gallery)
 The Return from Inkerman (1877 – Ferens Art Gallery, Kingston upon Hull)
 Remnants of an Army (1879 – Tate Gallery 
 Listed for the Connaught Rangers (1879 – Bury Art Museum)
 The Defence of Rorke's Drift (1880 – H.M The Queen; Windsor Castle)
 Scotland Forever! (1881 – Leeds Art Gallery)
 Tel-el-Kebir (1885)
 To the Front: French Cavalry Leaving a Breton City on the Declaration of War (1888–89 – Private Collection)
 Evicted (1890 – The Irish Folklore Commission University College Dublin)
 The Camel Corps (1891)
 Halt in a Forced March (1892 – Shropshire Military Museum, Shrewsbury)
 The Rescue of the Wounded (1895)
 The Dawn of Waterloo (1895 – Falkland Palace)
 Steady the Drums and Fifes (1897 – H.M. The Queen; 57th Regiment, The Middlesex)
 Floreat Etona! (1898 – Private Collection)
 Dawn at Waterloo (1898 – Private Collection)
 The Morning of Talavera (1898)
 The Colours: Advance of the Scots Guards at the Alma (1899 – Scots Guards)
 Within Sound of Guns (1903 – painted at Bansha Castle; Staff College, Camberley)
 Stand Fast Craigellachie (1903 – National War Museum Scotland)
 Rescue of Wounded, Afghanistan (1905 – Staff College, Camberley)
 In vain! Rally for a last charge of the Cuirassiers (1912 – Private Collection)
 The 16th Light Dragoons saving the remnants of the Union Brigade (1915 – Private Collection)
 On the Morrow of Talavera (1923 – Private Collection)
 The Charge of The Dorset Yeomanry at Agagia, 26th February, 1916 (1917 – [The Keep Military Museum, Dorchester])
 A Lament in the Desert (1925 – Private Collection)
 In the Retreat from Mons: The Royal Horse Guards (1927 – Royal Hospital, Chelsea)
 A Detachment of Cavalry in Flanders (1929 – Private Collection)

Gallery

Literature

Works by
 Letters from the Holy Land (London: A & C Black, 1903).
 From Sketch-book and Diary (London: A & C Black, 1909).
 An Autobiography (London: Constable & Co., Ltd., 1923).
 Autobiography (Sevenoaks: Fisher Press, 1993).

Works about
 Fillimore, Francis. – "Britain's Battle Painter: Lady Butler and Her Art". – New England Home Magazine. – Vol. XII, No. 13, September 1900, pp. 579–587 (also published in Windsor Magazine. – Vol. XI, December 1899 – May 1900, pp. 643–652)
 Gladwell, Malcolm. (2016). "The Lady Vanishes". – Episode 1, Season 1, Revisionist History Podcast. http://revisionisthistory.com/episodes/01-the-lady-vanishes 
 Gormanston, Eileen. (1953). – A Little Kept. – New York: Sheed and Ward
 Harrington, Peter. (1993). – British Artists and War: The Face of Battle in Paintings and Prints, 1700–1914. – London: Greenhill. – 
 Lalumia, Matthew Paul. – "Lady Elizabeth Thompson Butler in the 1870s". – Woman's Art Journal. – Vol. 4, No. 1, Spring–Summer 1983, pp. 9–14
 Lee, Michael. – "A Centenary of Military Painting". – Army Quarterly. – October 1967
 Meynell, Wilfrid. (1898). – The Life and Work of Lady Butler. – London: The Art Annual
 O'Byrne, M. K. – "Lady Butler". – Irish Monthly. – December 1950
 Usherwood, Paul. – "Elizabeth Thompson Butler: a case of tokenism." – Woman's Art Journal. – Vol. 11, Fall–Winter 1990–91, 14–15
 Usherwood, Paul, and Jenny Spencer-Smith, (1987). – Lady Butler, Battle Artist, 1846–1933. – Gloucester: Sutton. – 
 Walker, J. Crompton. (1927). – Irish Life & Landscape. – Dublin: Talbot Press
 Irish Arts Review. – "The Royal Scottish Academy Exhibitors 1826–1990". – Volume 4 Number 4:  Winter 1987. (Calne 1991)
  Chapter 3,The Victorian Artist by Julie Codell, 2012, Cambridge UP.
  Chapter 5, Masculinities in Victorian Painting by Joseph Kestner, 1995, Scolar Press.

References

External links

 
 
 Excerpt on Thompson's career from 'The Britain that Women Made', a BBC documentary by Amanda Vickery
 
 

1846 births
1933 deaths
19th-century British women artists
19th-century painters of historical subjects
19th-century war artists
20th-century British women artists
British expatriates in Switzerland
British suffragists
British war artists
British women painters
People from Lausanne
Women of the Victorian era
World War I artists